La Florida is a wetland and park known as the Parque Metropolitano La Florida. La Florida is located across the Bogotá River from Jaboque wetland in the municipality Funza, Cundinamarca, close to Cota. La Florida does not belong to the protected wetlands of Bogotá.

Flora and fauna

Birds 
In La Florida, 90 species of birds have been registered, of which 13 endemic, uniquely in this wetland:

Insects 
The dragonfly species Ischnura cruzi has been registered in La Florida, as well as in La Conejera and Santa María del Lago.

See also 

Biodiversity of Colombia, Bogotá savanna, Thomas van der Hammen Natural Reserve
Wetlands of Bogotá

References

Bibliography

Further reading

External links 
  Fundación Humedales de Bogotá
  Conozca los 15 humedales de Bogotá - El Tiempo

Wetlands of Bogotá
Geography of Cundinamarca Department